Morgan-Townsend House is a national historic site located at 13535 North Highway 19, Salt Springs, Florida in Marion County. The rectangular two and one-half story house is an example of Frame Vernacular construction from the late nineteenth century.

It was added to the National Register of Historic Places on September 26, 2013.

References

External links

National Register of Historic Places in Marion County, Florida